Jens Steinigen (born 2 September 1966) is a former East German and German biathlete.

He started his career in 1984, and became junior world champion. Due to the sporting problems in the DDR he failed to qualify for the 1988 Winter Olympics in Calgary. He won with the German relay team together with Ricco Groß, Mark Kirchner and Fritz Fischer at the 1992 Olympics in Albertville the gold medal. The following year he did again win a medal with the German relay team this time a bronze medal at the World Championships.

After his career as biathlete Steinigen became a courtlawyer.

Biathlon results
All results are sourced from the International Biathlon Union.

Olympic Games
1 medal (1 gold)

World Championships
2 medals (2 bronze)

*During Olympic seasons competitions are only held for those events not included in the Olympic program.

Individual victories
2 victories (1 In, 1 Sp)

*Results are from UIPMB and IBU races which include the Biathlon World Cup, Biathlon World Championships and the Winter Olympic Games.

References

External links
 
 

1966 births
Living people
German male biathletes
Biathletes at the 1992 Winter Olympics
Biathletes at the 1994 Winter Olympics
Olympic biathletes of Germany
Medalists at the 1992 Winter Olympics
Olympic medalists in biathlon
Olympic gold medalists for Germany
Biathlon World Championships medalists
People from Sächsische Schweiz-Osterzgebirge
Sportspeople from Saxony